Hugh Roy Crichton (20 January 1882 – 7 January 1955) was an Australian rules footballer who played with St Kilda in the Victorian Football League (VFL).

Notes

External links 

1882 births
1955 deaths
Australian rules footballers from Melbourne
St Kilda Football Club players
People from Footscray, Victoria